The Heart of a Lion is a lost 1917 silent film drama directed by Frank Lloyd and starring William Farnum. Fox Film Corporation produced and distributed the movie. It is based on a novel by Ralph Connor.

Cast
William Farnum – Barney Kemper
Mary Martin – Margaret Danforth
William Courtleigh, Jr. – Dick Kemper
Wanda Hawley – Iola Hamilton (*as Wanda Petit)
Walter Law – Tex
Marc Robbins – Hiram Danforth M.D.
Rita Bori – Dolly

See also
1937 Fox vault fire

References

External links
The Heart of a Lion at IMDb.com

web page on restoration of the film's surviving art poster
single sheet lobby poster

1917 films
American silent feature films
Lost American films
Films directed by Frank Lloyd
Fox Film films
Films based on Canadian novels
American black-and-white films
Silent American drama films
1917 drama films
1917 lost films
Lost drama films
1910s American films